Gombe State Geographic Information System (GOGIS) is a digitalised land administrative system that carried out the process of determining, recording, disseminating information about land acquisition, ownership, its value and land management policies in Gombe State.

History 
GOGIS was established by Gombe State Government to  put an end to land conflicts that is mostly caused by land  transactions done by unauthorised brokers  which often disrupt the peace and economic stability of the State.

 Inuwa Yahaya, the Governor of the state remarked on the establishment that

Administration

The Director General 
GOGIS is headed by a director general.  The current director general, Dr Kabiru Usman Hassan, was appointed in 2020 by the governor of Gombe State.

References 

Gombe State
Government agencies of Nigeria